FPSE may refer to:

 Free piston Stirling engine, a topic in thermodynamics
 Microsoft FrontPage#Server Extensions